USS O'Callahan (FF-1051) was a U.S. Navy  destroyer escort, later reclassified as a frigate. She was named for Chaplain Lieutenant Commander Joseph T. O'Callahan, a World War II Medal of Honor recipient for his rescue of crewmen on the aircraft carrier  after it was hit and severely damaged by enemy bombs.

History
O'Callahan was laid down on 19 February 1964 at the Defoe Shipbuilding Company in Bay City, Michigan and was launched on 20 October 1965.  She was sponsored by Chaplain O'Callahan's sister, Sister Rose Marie O'Callahan of the Philippines Maryknoll College, the first nun to sponsor a U.S. Navy ship.  She was commissioned on 13 July 1968 at the Boston Naval Shipyard, Boston, Massachusetts, with Captain Robert L. Brown commanding.

On 16 August 1968, after her fitting-out at Boston, O'Callahan departed for her homeport of San Diego, California.  En route she called at Norfolk, Virginia; Charleston, South Carolina; and Fort Lauderdale, Florida.  She stood out of San Diego on 1 October for 25 days of electronics and weapons systems tests off the Pacific Northwest, then commenced shakedown on 4 November.  After at-sea training operations off the Hawaiian Islands from 6 through 17 February 1969, she entered the Long Beach Naval Shipyard on 4 March for post-shakedown availability through mid-May.  She then conducted further training operations out of San Diego in preparation for her first deployment to the Western Pacific.

[1969-1989]

On 30 June 1975 O'Callahan was reclassified as a frigate and given the designation FF-1051.

Pakistan service

O'Callahan served until 31 May 1989, when she was decommissioned and leased to Pakistan.  However, following Pakistan's refusal to halt its nuclear weapons program, the lease was cancelled in 1994.  She was returned to United States custody at Singapore on 19 August 1994 and stricken from the Navy Register the same day. On 9 September she was transferred to the Maritime Administration and sold to Trusha Investments Pte. Ltd, c/o Jacques Pierot, Jr. & Sons, Inc., of New York City for over $600,000.  She was then towed to Hong Kong and scrapped.

References 
 K. Jack Bauer and Stephen S. Roberts, Register of Ships of the U.S. Navy, 1775-1990
 Conway's All the World's Fighting Ships 1947–1995

External links

 

Garcia-class frigates
Ships built in Bay City, Michigan
1965 ships
Cold War frigates and destroyer escorts of the United States
Ships transferred from the United States Navy to the Pakistan Navy
Garcia-class frigates of the Pakistan Navy